A severe thunderstorm watch (SAME code: SVA) is a severe weather watch product of the National Weather Service that is issued by regional offices of weather forecasting agencies throughout the world when meteorological conditions are favorable for the development of severe thunderstorms as defined by regional criteria that may contain large hail, straight-line winds, lightning, intense hydrological phenomena and/or tornadoes. A severe thunderstorm watch does not necessarily mean that severe weather is actually occurring, only that conditions present a credible risk for thunderstorms producing severe weather phenomena to affect portions of the watch area. A watch must not be confused with a severe thunderstorm warning.

Definition
A severe thunderstorm watch indicates that atmospheric conditions observed in and close to the watch area have created a significant risk for the development and intensification of convective thunderstorms that could exceed regional severe criterion, and are normally issued in advance of the onset of severe weather. Generally (but not always), thunderstorms that develop within the watch area may contain large hailstones, intense straight-line winds, intense lightning, torrential rainfall and/or flash flooding caused by high rainfall accumulations. Depending on storm cell intensity, severe thunderstorms can cause damage to structures or vehicles; impairment of vehicle and pedestrian travel; flooding to streets, populated neighborhoods, farmlands and other areas of poor drainage; and in extreme cases, injury or possible fatality to people and animals exposed outdoors (from either repeated hail-induced blunt trauma, wind-generated debris or intense flooding).

If severe weather actually does occur, a severe thunderstorm warning or tornado warning would then be issued. Residents and travelers in the watch area are advised to immediately undertake safety preparations ahead of the arrival of severe weather. A watch is not required for a thunderstorm- or other hydrological-based weather warning to be issued; severe thunderstorm warnings are often issued when a severe thunderstorm watch is not active (i.e., when a tornado watch is active or, less frequently, if severe convective storms are not expected to be of broad enough coverage to require a watch).

While a severe thunderstorm watch does not nominally imply the probability for tornadoes, if modest wind shear and storm-level helicity is conducive for a marginal tornado threat within the convective environment, storm cells that develop within the proximate severe thunderstorm watch area can occasionally exhibit mesocyclonic rotation at the cloud base and may spawn tornadoes if advanced tornadogenesis occurs. An existing severe thunderstorm watch, or merely a portion of it, can also be upgraded to a tornado watch, if conditions that were originally considered marginally conducive if at all for tornadic development have evolved to permit a greater risk of tornado formation; conversely, a section or the entirety of an existing tornado watch area can be replaced by a severe thunderstorm watch, if conditions are no longer considered conducive for tornadogenesis. Straight-line winds in severe thunderstorms created by strong downdrafts, however, can produce serious structural damage as severe as a lower-category tornado or hurricane over a path comparatively wider than a tornado.

When a severe thunderstorm watch is issued, people within the region of expected severe weather risk are advised to monitor conditions ahead of the developing weather situation; review thunderstorm safety precautions in the event they must seek immediate shelter; and use local broadcast media, weather radio, weather app alert notifications and/or SMS notifications to receive warnings and updated storm information.

Regional basis

United States
In the United States, severe thunderstorm watches are issued by the Storm Prediction Center (SPC), a national guidance center of the National Weather Service (NWS) branch of the National Oceanic and Atmospheric Administration (NOAA), for areas of the lower 48 states where atmospheric conditions favor the development of convective thunderstorm activity reaching severe criteria. Although seldom issued in those states, responsibilities for issuing severe thunderstorm watches covering Alaska and Hawaii are respectively handled by local NWS forecast offices in Fairbanks, Anchorage and Juneau, Alaska, and Honolulu, Hawaii. Watches are typically are valid for six to nine hours (extending if necessary as long as 12 hours during unusually steady-state or slow-moving severe weather events) after the time of issuance, and are intended to precede the first report of severe hail or wind by 45 minutes to one hour. SPC watch boxes—termed because the approximate watch area is represented as a quadrilateral for aviation purposes—are usually outlined in the approximate delineation of x miles north and south, or east and west, or either side of a line (perpendicular to the center line) from y miles direction of city, state, to z miles another direction of another city, state (e.g., "50 miles either side of a line from 10 miles northeast of Columbia, South Carolina to 15 miles south-southwest of Montgomery, Alabama").

In situations where atmospheric conditions will support the production of very destructive straight-line winds and hail from the convective activity, the intensified wording "particularly dangerous situation" (PDS) can be added into the watch product. The inclusion of PDS wording (more commonly used for tornado watches in area where the environment supports the development of strong to violent tornadoes) is rare for severe thunderstorm watches since the tornado threat, in comparison to the much higher threat of extreme wind or hail, must remain low enough to where a standard tornado watch is not warranted.

SPC meteorologists utilize WarnGen software integrated into the National Centers Advance Weather Interactive Processing System (N-AWIPS) and/or the SPC Product Generator (PRODGEN) to generate the watch statement, which is disseminated through various communication routes accessed by the media and various agencies, on the internet, to NOAA satellites, and over NOAA Weather Radio. The terms "blue box" and "yellow box" refer to the coloring assigned to severe thunderstorm watch boxes for hazard maps used by the Storm Prediction Center and the National Weather Service; coloring used by local television outlets to highlight severe thunderstorm watches sometimes vary (in many cases, severe weather alert displays used by many local television stations usually reserve yellow as a highlighter for severe thunderstorm warnings, and blue as a highlighter for severe thunderstorm watches).

The Storm Prediction Center, in conjunction with local NWS Weather Forecast Offices, issues component watch products to communicate the approximate area, primary hazards and other pertinent information about the severe thunderstorm watch to the public, NOAA meteorologists, emergency management and aviation personnel. The graphical and text Public Watch products—in addition to outlining the approximate affected area, valid time, meteorological and aviation discussions, and other pertinent information—includes language specifying the forecast severe weather threat (e.g., "widespread large hail and isolated very large hail events to 3 inches in diameter likely, scattered damaging wind gusts to 70 mph likely, a tornado or two possible") in the primary hazards list. The Watch Probability Table describes probabilities for all modes of severe weather, including probabilities of 10 or more severe wind or hail events and one or more reports of winds exceeding  or hailstones exceeding . (Typically, the minimum event probabilities for a severe thunderstorm watch issuance require a ~30% chance of 10 or more wind and hail reports and, for PDS watches, an 70% chance of one or more reports of >65 kt winds and/or >2-inch hail within the watch area over the valid time period.)

The SPC produces two separate products listing all counties or equivalent subdivisions (parishes, independent cities, and coastal marine zones) included in the broader watch area: Watch County Lists (WCL), which are produced internally preceding the watch issuance for collaborative use with local NWS offices to outline counties and equivalent subdivisions being proposed for inclusion in the watch, and Watch Outline Update (WOU) messages, a public list of the determined watch subdivisions published upon the initial severe thunderstorm watch issuance. Local NWS offices concurrently issue Watch County Notification (WCN) messages that list subdivisions within their designated area of responsibility that the office has considered to be in the initial watch; WCN messages—which the SPC uses as the basis for their Watch Outline Update product—are updated to denote changes to the watch by local WFOs, which are provided responsibility for adding or removing counties/subdivisions from the watch, extending its time of expiration, or cancelling the watch entirely if conditions no longer support a severe weather threat (if atmospheric conditions have become less conducive to form severe thunderstorms or were insufficient for severe weather development compared to earlier forecast analysis). The SPC updates Watch Outline Updates at least on an hourly basis to incorporate changes made by the accordant WFOs in their Watch County Notification messages.

The SPC issues Watch Status Messages to designate areas considered to have a continuing severe weather threat, based primarily on the position of surface features (such as cold fronts and drylines)—and the NWS offices decide what counties to remove from the watch (the local offices will almost always follow the SPC recommendation on the status messages). If conditions are no longer favorable for severe convective thunderstorms in the watch area, the severe thunderstorm watch may be cancelled outright; occasionally, a severe thunderstorm watch, if not merely a section of it, may be replaced by a tornado watch should conditions that were originally forecast to be conducive for non-tornadic severe thunderstorms evolve to allow an increased possibility of tornado formation, and likewise may replace a tornado watch if conditions for tornadogenesis are no longer considered favorable. If no convective development or reported severe weather occurs, this leads to a severe thunderstorm watch "bust", which can factor into determinations by the SPC and National Weather Service offices on whether to cancel the watch.

Because the Storm Prediction Center and local National Weather Service WFOs each have roles in the watch issuance process, the subdivisions listed in the Watch Outline Update and Watch County Notification products will sometimes differ from the outlined watch box area, including subdivisions located outside the outlined quadrilateral; however the local Weather Forecast Office is tasked with determining which counties should be included in or, in lieu of a new downstream watch, added to the designated watch area. The WFOs monitoring their sector of the watch area can also consult, via conference call, with the Storm Prediction Center to relay and determine locally dictated changes to the severe thunderstorm watch, regarding replacement of the watch and extensions of time and areal coverage if conditions warrant.

Canada
In Canada, Environment and Climate Change Canada (ECCC) issues severe thunderstorm watches through regional Meteorological Service (MSC) offices based in Vancouver, Edmonton, Winnipeg, Toronto, Montreal and Dartmouth. Unlike the box/subdivision structure of watches issued by the U.S. Storm Prediction Center, severe thunderstorm watches issued by the Meteorological Service are issued strictly for groups of census subdivisions, often covering a total area that is relatively smaller than severe thunderstorm watches in the U.S.). Watches are disseminated to the public through broadcast and online media outlets (including local television stations and The Weather Network/MétéoMédia), and Weatheradio Canada; depending on regional office discretion, the watch may require activation of the National Public Alerting System (Alert Ready) and feeding provincial alerting systems (such as Alberta Emergency Alert and SaskAlert) to distribute the alert to local broadcast media and cellular phones.

Philippines
In the Philippines, the Philippine Atmospheric, Geophysical and Astronomical Services Administration (PAGASA), through its regional services divisions, issues thunderstorm watches to alert regions and/or provinces of thunderstorm development within a period of twelve hours. Watches are disseminated to the public through terrestrial television and radio stations, and online media outlets.

Example products

Example of a severe thunderstorm watch
SEL0

   URGENT - IMMEDIATE BROADCAST REQUESTED
   Severe Thunderstorm Watch Number 300
   NWS Storm Prediction Center Norman OK
   235 PM EDT Wed Jun 24 2020

   The NATIONAL WEATHER SERVICE has issued

   * Severe Thunderstorm Watch #300 for portions of 
     southern Alabama
     western Florida Panhandle
     southwestern Georgia
     Coastal Waters

   * Effective this Wednesday afternoon and evening from 235 PM
     until 1000 PM EDT.

   * Primary threats include...
     Scattered damaging wind gusts to 70 mph possible
     A tornado or two possible

   SUMMARY...Numerous thunderstorms will continue developing over
   southern portion of the Gulf Coast states this afternoon. Multicell
   and some marginal supercell structures are likely with damaging wind
   the main threat, and a tornado or two possible.

   The severe thunderstorm watch area is approximately along and 75
   statute miles north and south of a line from 20 miles north
   northwest of Mobile AL to 55 miles southeast of Macon GA. For a
   complete depiction of the watch see the associated watch outline
   update (WOUS64 KWNS WOU0).

   PRECAUTIONARY/PREPAREDNESS ACTIONS...

   REMEMBER...A Severe Thunderstorm Watch means conditions are
   favorable for the development of severe weather, including large hail and damaging winds in and close to the watch area.
   Persons should be on the lookout for rapidy changing 
   weather conditions and listen for later statements and possible
   warnings. Severe thunderstorms can and occasionally do produce
   tornadoes.

   &&

   AVIATION...A few severe thunderstorms with hail surface and aloft to
   1 inch. Extreme turbulence and surface wind gusts to 60 knots. A few
   cumulonimbius with maximum tops to 500. Mean storm motion vector
   24035.

   ...Dial

Example of Severe Thunderstorm Watch with PDS wording
 SEL6

   URGENT - EAS ACTIVATION REQUESTED
   Severe Thunderstorm Watch Number 426
   NWS Storm Prediction Center Norman OK
   1125 AM CDT Mon Aug 10 2020

   The National weather service has issued 

   * Severe Thunderstorm Watch #426 for portions of 
     Eastern Iowa
     Northern Illinois
     Far northwest Indiana
     Far southern Wisconsin
     Lake Michigan

   * Effective this Monday morning and evening from 1125 AM until
     700 PM CDT.

   ...THIS IS A PARTICULARLY DANGEROUS SITUATION...

   * Primary threats include...
     Widespread damaging winds and scattered significant gusts to 100
       mph likely
     Isolated large hail events to 1.5 inches in diameter possible
     A couple tornadoes possible

   SUMMARY...A derecho will rapidly progress across eastern Iowa and
   northern Illinois this afternoon. Widespread severe wind gusts, some
   of which should reach 80-120 mph are anticipated along the track of
   the bow. Brief tornadoes are also possible.

   The severe thunderstorm watch area is approximately along and 85
   statute miles north and south of a line from 20 miles west southwest
   of Cedar Rapids IA to 75 miles south southeast of Racine WI. For a
   complete depiction of the watch see the associated watch outline
   update (WOUS64 KWNS WOU6).

   PRECAUTIONARY/PREPAREDNESS ACTIONS...

   REMEMBER...A Severe Thunderstorm Watch means conditions are
   favorable for the development of severe weather, including large hail and damaging winds in and close to the watch area.
   Persons should be on the lookout for rapidly 
   weather conditions and listen for later statements and possible
   warnings. Severe thunderstorms can and occasionally do produce
   tornadoes.

   &&

   OTHER WATCH INFORMATION...CONTINUE...WW 425...

   AVIATION...A few severe thunderstorms with hail surface and aloft to
   1.5 inches. Extreme turbulence and surface wind gusts to 85 knots. A
   few cumulonimbi with maximum tops to 600. Mean storm motion vector
   27055.

   ...Grams

Example of a Watch Outline Update

   BULLETIN - IMMEDIATE BROADCAST REQUESTED
   SEVERE THUNDERSTORM WATCH OUTLINE UPDATE FOR WS 271
   NWS STORM PREDICTION CENTER NORMAN OK
   1135 AM EDT SUN JUN 2 2013
   
   SEVERE THUNDERSTORM WATCH 271 IS IN EFFECT UNTIL 800 PM EDT
   FOR THE FOLLOWING LOCATIONS
   
   CTC003-005-030000-
   /O.NEW.KWNS.SV.A.0271.130602T1535Z-130603T0000Z/
   
   CT 
   .    CONNECTICUT COUNTIES INCLUDED ARE
   
   HARTFORD             LITCHFIELD          
   
   MAC003-011-013-015-017-027-030000-
   /O.NEW.KWNS.SV.A.0271.130602T1535Z-130603T0000Z/
   
   MA 
   .    MASSACHUSETTS COUNTIES INCLUDED ARE
   
   BERKSHIRE            FRANKLIN            HAMPDEN             
   HAMPSHIRE            MIDDLESEX           WORCESTER           
   
   
   MEC001-003-005-007-011-017-019-021-025-031-030000-
   /O.NEW.KWNS.SV.A.0271.130602T1535Z-130603T0000Z/
   
   ME 
   .    MAINE COUNTIES INCLUDED ARE
   
   ANDROSCOGGIN         AROOSTOOK           CUMBERLAND          
   FRANKLIN             KENNEBEC            OXFORD              
   PENOBSCOT            PISCATAQUIS         SOMERSET            
   YORK                 
   
   
   NHC001-003-005-007-009-011-013-015-017-019-030000-
   /O.NEW.KWNS.SV.A.0271.130602T1535Z-130603T0000Z/
   
   NH 
   .    NEW HAMPSHIRE COUNTIES INCLUDED ARE
   
   BELKNAP              CARROLL             CHESHIRE            
   COOS                 GRAFTON             HILLSBOROUGH        
   MERRIMACK            ROCKINGHAM          STRAFFORD           
   SULLIVAN             
   
   
   NYC001-019-021-027-031-035-039-057-083-091-093-095-111-113-115-
   030000-
   /O.NEW.KWNS.SV.A.0271.130602T1535Z-130603T0000Z/
   
   NY 
   .    NEW YORK COUNTIES INCLUDED ARE
   
   ALBANY               CLINTON             COLUMBIA            
   DUTCHESS             ESSEX               FULTON              
   GREENE               MONTGOMERY          RENSSELAER          
   SARATOGA             SCHENECTADY         SCHOHARIE           
   ULSTER               WARREN              WASHINGTON          
   
   
   VTC001-003-005-007-009-011-013-015-017-019-021-023-025-027-
   030000-
   /O.NEW.KWNS.SV.A.0271.130602T1535Z-130603T0000Z/
   
   VT 
   .    VERMONT COUNTIES INCLUDED ARE
   
   ADDISON              BENNINGTON          CALEDONIA           
   CHITTENDEN           ESSEX               FRANKLIN            
   GRAND ISLE           LAMOILLE            ORANGE              
   ORLEANS              RUTLAND             WASHINGTON          
   WINDHAM              WINDSOR             
   
   
   ATTN...WFO...BOX...BTV...ALY...GYX...CAR...

See also

 Severe weather terminology (United States)
 Particularly Dangerous Situation

References

External links
 Meteorological Service of Canada
 Current U.S. Watches

Weather warnings and advisories